The 1925 Dallas mayoral election was a mayoral election held alongside municipal elections in Dallas. Louis Blaylock beat Marvin E. Martin, W.S. Brambett, and, M.A. Smith, his opponents, for the office of mayor.

References

1925 Texas elections
Dallas
Mayoral elections in Dallas
Non-partisan elections